Jabberwacky is a chatterbot created by British programmer Rollo Carpenter. Its stated aim is to "simulate natural human chat in an interesting, entertaining and humorous manner". It is an early attempt at creating an artificial intelligence through human interaction.

Purpose 
The stated purpose of the project is to create an artificial intelligence that is capable of passing the Turing Test. It is designed to mimic human interaction and to carry out conversations with users. It is not designed to carry out any other functions.

Unlike more traditional AI programs, the learning technology is intended as a form of entertainment rather than being used for computer support systems or corporate representation. Recent developments do allow a more scripted, controlled approach to sit atop the general conversational AI, aiming to bring together the best of both approaches, and usage in the fields of sales and marketing is underway.

The ultimate intention is that the program move from a text based system to be wholly voice operated—learning directly from sound and other sensory inputs. Its creator believes that it can be incorporated into objects around the home such as robots or talking pets, intending both to be useful and entertaining, keeping people company.

Cleverbot 
Cleverbot is the evolved version of the older Jabberwacky chatterbot, or chatbot, originally launched in 1997 on the web. Jabberwacky's website is now tagged as "legacy only."

Timeline 
 1981 – The first incarnation of this project is created as a program hard-coded on a Sinclair ZX81.
 1988 – Learning AI project founded as 'Thoughts'
 1997 – Launched on the Internet as 'Jabberwacky'
 October 2003 – Jabberwacky is awarded third place in the Loebner Prize. It was beaten by Juergen Pirner's Jabberwock (A German-based chat program)
 September 2004 – Jabberwacky is awarded second place in the Loebner Prize. It was beaten by computer chat program A.L.I.C.E.
 September 2005 – George, a character within Jabberwacky, wins the Loebner Prize
 September 2006 – Joan, another Jabberwacky character, wins the Loebner Prize
 October 2008 – A new variant of Jabberwacky is launched, more fuzzy and with deeper context, under the name Cleverbot
 January 2023 – In 2023, the legacy website registered a 504 Gateway Time-out multiple times and a redirect at least once to boibot.com on February 28, 2023. According to the Internet Archive's Wayback Machine, the site was last active and working on December 31, 2022. No media site covered the change or noted any press release about it.

See also 
 Artificial Linguistic Internet Computer Entity (ALICE)
 Chatterbot
 Loebner Prize

References

External links
 www.jabberwacky.com The Official Website
 Jabberwacky entry  to the Loebner Prize 2005

Chatbots
Applied machine learning